Carolina Garcia-Aguilera (born July 13, 1949) is an American writer born in Havana, Cuba. She has written seven (7) novels in a mystery series, three (3) stand-alone novels, numerous short stories and contributed to a number of Anthologies. Carolina Garcia-Aguilera moved to the United States when she was 10 years old. She attended Miss Porter's Preparatory School in Farmington, Connecticut, for high school before graduating from Rollins College in Winter Park, FL, with a B.A. in history and political science. Carolina Garcia-Aguilera went on to obtain a master's degree in Language and Linguistics, an MBA in Finance, and has continued studies for a PhD in Latin American Affairs.

In 1986 Carolina Garcia-Aguilera became a private investigator with a goal of writing a series featuring a female Cuban-American P.I. based in Miami. The first book in the Lupe (Guadalupe) Solano mystery series was published in 1996, and was followed by six (6) other Lupe Solano books. "Havana Heat" published in 2000 won the 2001 Shamus Award for Best P.I. Hard Cover Novel.

Works
Lupe Solano series:
 Bloody Waters (1996)
 Bloody Shame (1997)
 Bloody Secrets (1998)
 A Miracle in Paradise (1999)
 Havana Heat (2000)
 Bitter Sugar (2001)
 Bloody Twist (2010)

Other Novels:
One Hot Summer (2002) was adapted as a Lifetime Movie and was released for Television on July 26, 2009.
Luck of the Draw (2003). The Matriarch of the Navarro Clan decides that the family should gather and reestablish the long-lost family casino in Havana, "La Estrella", in Miami.  When the family discovers that Diamond Navarro, a journalist in Las Vegas, is missing, The Matriarch orders Esmeralda Navarro, the oldest daughter of five, to Las Vegas to find Diamond and bring her home.
Magnolia (2012)

Anthology Contributions:
From The Private Eye Writers of America comes "Fifty Shades of Grey Fedora" (2013; edited by Robert J. Randisi, this anthology features stories by MaxAllan Collins, Sara Paretsky, John Lutz, Gary Phillips, Carolina Garcia-Aguilera and 12 others.

See also
 Cuban American literature
 List of Cuban-American writers

References

External links
 Official website

1949 births
Living people
20th-century American novelists
21st-century American novelists
American mystery writers
American women novelists
American writers of Cuban descent
Cuban emigrants to the United States
Cuban women novelists
Miss Porter's School alumni
People from Havana
Rollins College alumni
Shamus Award winners
Writers from Miami
Women mystery writers
20th-century American women writers
21st-century American women writers
Novelists from Florida